Robert Charles Pozen known as "Bob" (born 1946) is an American financial executive with a strong interest in public policy. Pozen currently teaches executives about how to be more productive and serves as an executive coach and mentor, www.bobpozen.com .  He is the former chairman of MFS Investment Management, the oldest mutual fund company in the United States. Previously, Pozen was the President of Fidelity Investments.  As of 2020 he is a senior lecturer at MIT Sloan School of Management, and a senior fellow at the Brookings Institution.

Education and family
Pozen grew up in Bridgeport, Connecticut, where he attended public high school and won a scholarship to attend Harvard College. In 1968, he graduated summa cum laude and Phi Beta Kappa from Harvard, which awarded him a Knox Traveling Fellowship.

In 1972, Pozen received a J.D. degree from Yale Law School, where he served on the editorial board of the Yale Law Journal. He received a JSD from Yale in 1973 for his doctoral thesis on state enterprises in Africa. He is a member of the Massachusetts, New York and Washington, D.C. bars.

He has been married for more than 40 years to Elizabeth Kelner Pozen, a psychotherapist and figurative painter. They live in Boston, Massachusetts, and have two adult children.

Investment industry career
Pozen was an executive at Fidelity Investments from 1987 to 2001, eventually rising to vice chairman of the company and president of FMR Co., the investment adviser to Fidelity’s mutual funds. In the latter role, he had oversight of Fidelity’s global portfolio management and research teams; during his tenure as president, Fidelity’s assets under management increased from $500 billion to $900 billion. He also was a director of Fidelity’s insurance company and credit card bank.

Pozen became chairman of MFS Investment Management in February 2004. In that position, he advised the firm on strategic initiatives and long-term planning. Speaking on corporate governance, he has been credited with enhancing the organization’s legal, audit, and risk functions. He retired as Chairman in July 2010 and was Chairman Emeritus through 2011. In 2011, he was recognized for his work in the mutual fund industry with the Fund Action Lifetime Achievement Award.

Productivity and executive coaching work
Pozen currently teaches courses on "Maximizing your Productivity" for corporations around the globe as well as for the MIT Executive Education program.  Pozen's website can be found at www.bobpozen.com.  Pozen is also an executive coach, a role he started actively playing in 2019.  His teachings are based on his 2019 research published by MIT News, "How does your productivity stack up? Survey results and research by MIT Sloan’s Bob Pozen reveal common habits and skills among highly productive managers".  In 2012, Pozen published his book "Extreme Productivity: Boost Your Results, Reduce Your Hours" (2012, Harper Business) which set the foundation for his coursework. In 2018, Pozen's work on Productivity at MIT was one of the top rated stories of the year.

Teaching positions
 1973-74: Visiting professor, Georgetown University Law Center
 1974-76: Associate professor, New York University Law School
 2002-03: John Olin Visiting Professor, Harvard Law School
 2006-07: Senior lecturer, MIT Sloan School of Management
 2007–2013: Senior lecturer, Harvard Business School
 2013–present: MIT Sloan School of Management

In December 2019, MIT announced the Miriam Pozen Prize to recognize outstanding financial policy research or practices. Pozen is funding the $200,000 prize, MIT’s first in the financial policy area. It will be given every other year, starting in the spring of 2020.

Public service
In addition to his private sector and teaching posts, Pozen has dedicated time during his career to public service. He was Associate General Counsel for the U.S. Securities and Exchange Commission (SEC) from 1977 to 1980.

In 2001 and 2002, he served as a member of President George W. Bush's Commission to Strengthen Social Security. His proposal for utilizing a "progressive indexing" methodology to address Social Security’s long-term solvency issue received national attention, including a mention during President Bush's 2006 State of the Union address.

At the state level, Pozen served as Secretary of Economic Affairs in 2003 under then-Massachusetts Governor Mitt Romney during a time of economic uncertainty after the 2001 US recession. Pozen was responsible for all economic-related areas, including banking, technology, consumer affairs, insurance, and labor.

In 2007, Pozen served as chairman of the SEC's Committee to Improve Financial Reporting. Working with both private and public sector experts, the committee made several actionable recommendations to improve the U.S. financial reporting system, many of which have been implemented.

Boards/memberships
 Former board member, Medtronic, Inc. 2006-2018
 Board member, The Nielsen Company
 Former board member, Bell Canada Enterprises
 Former Trustee, Commonwealth Fund (healthcare foundation)
 Former board member, Harvard NeuroDiscovery Center
 Former board member, National Basketball Hall of Fame
 Former vice chairman, Boston Public Library Foundation
 Fellow, American Academy of Arts and Sciences
 Senior Non-resident Fellow, Brookings Institution
 Member, Council on Foreign Relations
 Member, Committee on Capital Markets Regulation

Key publications

Selected books
 Extreme Productivity: Boost Your Results, Reduce Your Hours (2012, Harper Business)
 The Fund Industry: How Your Money is Managed (with Theresa Hamacher, 2011, John Wiley)
 Too Big to Save? How to Fix the U.S. Financial System (2009, John Wiley)
 Financial Institutions: Investment Management (1997, West Publishing)

Selected productivity articles and videos by Pozen and about Pozen's work
 MIT News, "How does your productivity stack up?" Survey results and research by MIT Sloan’s Bob Pozen reveal common habits and skills among highly productive managers. (July 16, 2019)
 Harvard Business Review, "What Makes Some People More Productive Than Others" (with Kevin Downey, March 28, 2019)
 Harvard Business Review, "Assessment: How Productive Are You?" (August 28, 2018)
 MIT Sloan Executive Education innovation@work Blog, "Supercharge your productivity: 3 big ideas from Bob Pozen" (February 4, 2018)
 MIT Sloan Executive Education, Video, "Maximizing Your Personal Productivity"  (October 16, 2015) 
 MIT Sloan Executive Education, "Five tips for improving every-day productivity" (February 13, 2014)
 Harvard Business Review, "The Delicate Art of Giving Feedback" (March 28, 2013)
 Fast Company, "Bob Pozen, Master Of Extreme Productivity, Shares His 3 Most Effective Career Tips" by Drake Baer (October 25, 2012)
 Harvard Business Review, "Managing Yourself: Extreme Productivity" May 2011

Selected financial articles
 MarketWatch, "Opinion: 7 states where Obamacare is cheaper and works better" (January 6, 2020)
 MarketWatch, "Opinion: This is the tax break America’s 1% will cling to — even after death" (December 14, 2019)
 Harvard Business Review, "What Machine Learning Will Mean for Asset Managers" (with Jonathan Ruane, December 3, 2019)
 Financial Times, "Will bots replace humans in active equity investment?" (October 1, 2019)
 MarketWatch, "Opinion: Tie CEO pay to increases in stakeholder and shareholder value" (Sept 9, 2019)
 CFO, "What Canada Teaches Us About Internal Controls" (July 31, 2019)
 Pensions&Investments, "Commentary: Board composition drives performance in public plans" (August 19, 2019)
 MarketWatch, "Opinion: 401(k) retirees won’t buy annuities unless they are better designed" (July 15, 2019)
 Wall Street Journal, Opinion, "Executive Pay Needs a Transparent Scorecard" (Robert J. Jackson Jr. and Robert C. Pozen
April 10, 2019)
 Financial Times, "EU’s attempt to tackle ‘ratings shopping’ is falling short" (June 14, 2018)
 Financial Times, "Spotify’s direct listing is a template for unicorns riding high" (January 20, 2018)
 Financial Times, "Trump tax bills push US jobs and factories abroad" (November 28, 2017)
 Financial Times, "In defence of quarterly reports" (October 9, 2016)
 Wall Street Journal, "Opinion: Keeping Corporate Managements Honest" (August 19, 2013)
 Financial Times, "Short-selling bans are a mistake" (August 12, 2011)
 Science Translational Medicine, "Defining Success for Translational Research Organizations" (with Heather Kline, August 3, 2011)
 Huffington Post, "Social Security Reform Is the Key to the Debt Ceiling Debate" (July 19, 2011)
 Washington Post, "A debt plan Republicans can support" (July 19, 2011)
 Washington Post, "Wading into money-market funds?" (with Theresa Hamacher, July 6, 2011)
 Financial Times, "Don't hobble money market funds" (with Theresa Hamacher, June 19, 2011)
 Harvard Business Review, "Managing Yourself: Extreme Productivity" (May 2011)
 Financial Times, "European funds are outgunning US rivals" (with Theresa Hamacher, April 13, 2011)
 Washington Post, "A bond backfire after racing to buy long-term Treasuries and sell tax-exempt funds" (with Theresa Hamacher, April 5, 2011)
 Morningstar Advisor, "The Global Fund-Leadership Playoffs: Europe vs. the U.S." (with Theresa Hamacher, April/May 2011)
 Forbes, "Heretic Reality: Mortgage Interest Deduction Needs To Be Slashed" (March 25, 2011)
 Washington Post, "Why Liberals Should Back Social Security Reform" (March 22, 2011)
 Financial Times, "Japan can rebuild on new economic foundations" (March 21, 2011)
 Wall Street Journal, "A New Model for Corporate Boards" (December 30, 2010)
 Harvard Business Review, "The Case for Professional Boards" (December 2010)
 New York Times, "For Social Security, A Birthday Makeover" (August 22, 2010)
 Wall Street Journal, "Bashing Beijing Will Not Help Our Trade Deficit" (August 20, 2010)
 Wall Street Journal, "$100,000 is Plenty for Deposit Insurance" (June 23, 2010)
 Financial Times, "Chatter About a New Global Currency is Overblown," (July 29, 2009)
 Forbes, "Stop Pining for Glass-Steagall," (September/October 2009)
 Wall Street Journal, "Systemic Risk and the Fed," (July 9, 2009)
 Wall Street Journal, "How to Value Toxic Bank Assets," (February 3, 2009)
 Financial Times, "Foundations to be Laid Before Bridging Gap," (November 19, 2008)
 New York Times, "Think First, Bail Out Later," (June 15, 2008)
 New York Times, "Reporting for Duty," (March 3, 2007)
 Harvard Business Review, "If Private Equity Sized Up Your Business," (November 2007)
 Fortune, "China Goes from Red to Gray," (June 26, 2006)
 Harvard Business Review, "Before You Split that CEO Chair," (April 2006)
 Pensions & Investments, "Overstating Performance," (February 20, 2006)
 USA Today, "Why My Plan to Fix Social Security Will Work," (June 13, 2005)
 Foreign Affairs, "Mind the Gap," Vol. 84, No. 2, 8-12 (March/April 2005)
 The Economist, "The Route to Real Pension Reform," 69 (January 8, 2005)
 Harvard Business Review, "Arm Yourself for the Coming Battle Over Social Security," Vol. 80 at 52 (November 2002)
 Harvard Business Review, "Institutional Investors: The Reluctant Activists," Vol. 72 of 140 (January/February 1994)

Sources
 Tracy Mayor. December 4, 2018. "The top 10 MIT Sloan stories of 2018." 
 Jason Furman. March 21, 2005. "An Analysis of Using "Progressive Indexing" to Set Social Security Benefits." Center on Budget and Policy Priorities. 
 Bloomberg News. March 23, 2005. "Bush Hawks Financier Pozen's Plan as Social Security Compromise." 
 The New Republic.  April 11, 2005. Ryan Lizza. "Face Plant."
 The Progress Report. May 19, 2005. "Pozen Blasts Bush Privatization Plans."  
 Reuters. May 19, 2005. Mark Felsenthal.  "Drop private accounts - US Social Security advisor."
 Barron's. July 18, 2005. Jack Willoughby. "A Prudent Man to the Rescue."

External links
 
 Harvard Business School faculty home page
 

1946 births
20th-century American Jews
Georgetown University Law Center faculty
Harvard College alumni
Harvard Business School faculty
Living people
MIT Sloan School of Management faculty
Social security in the United States
State cabinet secretaries of Massachusetts
Yale Law School alumni
21st-century American Jews